Nils Egil Aaness (born 31 January 1936) is a former speed skater from Norway.

Aaness competed on the Norwegian national team from 1959 to 1965, and thus became part of the Norwegian speedskating revolution under the trainer Stein Johnson. His best season was 1962/1963, when he won silver at the Norwegian Allround Championships, skated a world record on the big combination one week later (in late January), became European Allround Champion in Gothenburg early February, and won bronze at the World Allround Speed Skating Championships of Karuizawa three weeks after that.

Nils Aaness had his best years alongside Knut Johannesen, and usually ended up a good number two after him. Aaness won a total of three silver medals and one bronze medal at the Norwegian Championships – every time behind Johannesen.

Medals 
An overview of medals won by Aaness at important championships he participated in, listing the years in which he won each:

Records

World record 
Over the course of his career, Aaness skated one world record:

Source: SpeedSkatingStats.com

Personal records 
To put these personal records in perspective, the WR column lists the official world records on the dates that Aaness skated his personal records.

Note that Aaness's personal record on the 5,000 m was not a world record because Knut Johannesen skated 7:37.8 at the same tournament.

Aaness has an Adelskalender score of 179.158 points. His highest ranking on the Adelskalender was a second place.

References 

 Nils Aaness at SpeedSkatingStats.com
 Nils Aaness. Deutsche Eisschnelllauf Gemeinschaft e.V. (German Skating Association).
 Personal records from Jakub Majerski's Speedskating Database
 Evert Stenlund's Adelskalender pages
 Historical World Records. International Skating Union.
 National Championships results. Norges Skøyteforbund (the Norwegian Skating Association).

1936 births
Living people
World record setters in speed skating
Norwegian male speed skaters
Olympic speed skaters of Norway
Speed skaters at the 1960 Winter Olympics
Speed skaters at the 1964 Winter Olympics
World Allround Speed Skating Championships medalists
20th-century Norwegian people